A mural is any piece of artwork painted or applied directly on a wall, ceiling or other large permanent surface. 

Mural may also refer to:

Arts, entertainment and media
El mural, a 2010 Argentine film
MURAL Festival, an annual international street art festival in Montreal, Quebec, Canada
Mural (1943), a painting by American artist Jackson Pollock
Mural (film), 2011 Chinese film directed by Gordon Chan
Mural (Guadalajara), newspaper in Guadalajara, Mexico

Natural formations
Mural Formation, a geologic formation that preserves fossils dating back to the Cambrian period, Alberta, Canada
Mural Nunatak, a nunatak on Hektoria Glacier, Graham Land, Antarctica
Mural Limestone, a geologic formation in Arizona, U.S.

Other uses
Manjunath Mural (born 1973), Indian chef 
Mexican muralism, a social and political movement in Mexico starting in the 1920s
Mural Art Museum, mural arts museum in Kerala, India
Mural Arts Program, an anti-graffiti mural program in Philadelphia, Pennsylvania, U.S.
Mural cell, a type of vascular cell
Mural crown, a headpiece representing city walls or towers
Mural instrument, an angle-measuring device used for astronomical purposes
Mural thrombus, a thrombus that adheres to the wall of a blood vessel
Operation Mural, clandestine effort to facilitate the emigration of Jewish Moroccan children to Israel, 1961
mural.com, a visual collaboration web site
, a building in Mexico City, Mexico